Solo boxeo is a Spanish language boxing series airing in the United States that currently airs on UniMás. Along its history, it has featured Hispanic boxers promoted by Top Rank and Golden Boy Promotions.

The show debuted in 2000, hosted by Ricardo Celis and Bernardo Osuna, and was cancelled in late 2008 during the Great Recession.

The show returned in 2010, and is currently hosted by Ernesto Amador and Israel Vazquez, a former boxer and world champion.

References

External links

2000 American television series debuts
2008 American television series endings
2010 American television series debuts
2017 American television series endings
Spanish-language television programming in the United States
UniMás original programming
Univision original programming
Boxing television series